Kodumudi railway station is a station at Kodumudi in Erode district, Tamil Nadu, India. The station is a stoppage for 18 halting trains and connects the religious pilgrimage center, Magudeswarar Temple, Kodumudi.

References

Railway stations in Erode district
Salem railway division